Qezel Arkh-e Sofla (also Romanized as Qezel Ārkh-e Soflá; also known as Maḩmūd Kandī; also known as Qezel Ārkh) is a village in Chaybasar-e Shomali Rural District, Bazargan District, Maku County, West Azerbaijan Province, Iran. At the 2006 census, its population was 506, in 80 families.

References 

Populated places in Maku County